Sam Schröder and Niels Vink defeated Heath Davidson and Ymanitu Silva in the final, 6–2, 6–2 to win the quad doubles wheelchair tennis title at the 2022 French Open.

Andy Lapthorne and David Wagner were the defending champions, but were defeated in the semifinals by Davidson and Silva.

Seeds

Draw

Finals

References

External Links
 Draw

Wheelchair Quad Doubles
French Open, 2022 Quad Doubles